The 1872 United States presidential election in Wisconsin was held on November 5, 1872 as part of the 1872 United States presidential election. State voters chose ten electors to the Electoral College, who voted for president and vice president.

Republican Party candidate and incumbent President Ulysses S. Grant won Wisconsin with 54.60 percent of the popular vote, winning the state's ten electoral votes.

Results

See also
 United States presidential elections in Wisconsin

References

Wisconsin
1872 Wisconsin elections
1872